The former First Church of Christ, Scientist, built in 1939, is  an historic Classical revival style Christian Science church edifice located at 501 Riverside Drive, overlooking the Truckee River in Reno, Nevada. Anna Frandsen Loomis, a wealthy local Christian Scientist, underwrote the $120,000 cost of the building, including land acquisition and architect's fees. She was responsible for hiring noted Los Angeles architect Paul Revere Williams, the first African-American member of the AIA. In 1998 the congregation sold the building and used the funds from the sale to construct a new church at 795 West Peckham Lane. Church member and local theater patron Moya Lear donated $1.1 million to the Reno-Sparks Theater Community Coalition, which used the funding to purchase the First Church of Christ, Scientist and renamed it the Lear Theater.

On December 28, 1982, the building was added to the Nevada State Register of Historic Places. and on August 20, 1999,  it was added to the National Register of Historic Places.

See also
List of Registered Historic Places in Nevada
List of former Christian Science churches, societies and buildings
 First Church of Christ, Scientist (disambiguation)

References

External links
National Register listing
Lear Theater website

Churches in Reno, Nevada
Former churches in Nevada
Churches completed in 1939
Churches on the National Register of Historic Places in Nevada
Former Christian Science churches, societies and buildings in the United States
National Register of Historic Places in Reno, Nevada
Nevada State Register of Historic Places
Paul Williams (architect) buildings
Neoclassical architecture in Nevada
Neoclassical church buildings in the United States